Thrandeston is a small village on the Norfolk/Suffolk border in England.

Overview 

The village is split into two areas, Thrandeston Little Green and Thrandeston Great Green. Most of the housing, the church and rectory are situated in the former and grouped around the triangular green or the three roads leading off it.  These lead to Eye, Mellis and Palgrave.

Thrandeston sits on slightly higher ground away from the southern point of the river Waveney that forms the county boundary. The village is situated on the 'High Suffolk' claylands, making it suitable for arable farming.

The village is about a mile away from both the A143 road from Bury St Edmunds to Great Yarmouth and the A140 from Norwich to Ipswich. These were formally turnpike roads of 1762 and 1711, respectively.

History 
There are three moated sites at Malting Farm, Church Farm and Goswold Hall. Goswold Hall has links with the Grey family, the most famous member of which was Lady Jane Grey

Thrandeston has its origins in the arable community mainly in the growing of hemp, as the nearby town of Diss was a large linen market. Three linen weavers, a tailor and a collar maker were all listed in the village in the late 17th century. A cattle fair was held annually on 31 July and in 1848 there were 347 inhabitants.

Church
St Margaret, Thrandeston contains the armorial bearings of the Rix and Blakeby families. The 15th century tower has a dedicatory inscription.  It remembers that the Sulyards and the Cornwallises had it built.  Inside are medieval carvings and wooden figures and animals, thought to be witches.

References 

 Domesday Book 1986 Suffolk Phillimore

External links 

  - Appraisal for Thrandeston as a conservation area by local authority
  - Thrandeston Village Web Site
  - Family tree of the Grey Family
  - Impressions of St Margaret Thrandeston

Villages in Suffolk
Mid Suffolk District
Civil parishes in Suffolk